Ante Ivković (born April 18, 1947) is a Croatian former footballer who played in the Yugoslav First League, National Soccer League, Swiss Challenge League, and Belgian Second Division.

Club career 
Ivković began his career in 1964 with Hajduk Split in the Yugoslav First League, and made his debut on August 14, 1965 against OFK Beograd. Throughout his time with Hajduk he won the league title in 1971, and the 1966–67 Yugoslav Cup. In 1972, he played with FK Borac Banja Luka, and returned to Hajduk in 1973. At the conclusion of the 1973 season he went abroad to play in the National Soccer League with Toronto Croatia. After his stint in Canada he played the remainder of his career in the Swiss Challenge League, and Belgian Second Division with FC Luzern, and K.A.A. Gent.

References 

1947 births
Living people
Association football midfielders
Yugoslav footballers
HNK Hajduk Split players
FK Borac Banja Luka players
Toronto Croatia players
FC Luzern players
K.A.A. Gent players
Yugoslav First League players
Canadian National Soccer League players
Swiss Challenge League players
Challenger Pro League players
Yugoslav expatriate footballers
Expatriate soccer players in Canada
Yugoslav expatriate sportspeople in Canada
Expatriate footballers in Switzerland
Yugoslav expatriate sportspeople in Switzerland
Expatriate footballers in Belgium
Yugoslav expatriate sportspeople in Belgium